The 2014 Champions Indoor Football season was the second and final season of the Champions Professional Indoor Football League (CPIFL). With players like Clemson's #20 Antonio Clay with the Kansas Koyotes. It was the result of the brainchild of Sioux City Bandits owner Bob Scott. The regular season began on Friday, February 28 when the Lincoln Haymakers lost to the Wichita Wild in Nebraska, 62–10. It finished on Saturday, June 7. The league champion was the Wichita Wild, who defeated the Sioux City Bandits by a score of 46–41 in the 2014 Champions Bowl. The season MVP was Rocky Hinds of the Wichita Wild. The CPIFL merged with the Lone Star Football League over the offseason, to create Champions Indoor Football (CIF).

Standings

y - clinched top overall seed

x - clinched playoff berth

Playoffs

References

External links
 Official website

 
Champions Professional Indoor Football League